Sidi Slimane may refer to:
Places in Morocco:
Sidi Slimane Province, Rabat-Salé-Kénitra
Sidi Slimane, Morocco, a city in Sidi Slimane Province 
Sidi Slimane Air Base, an airbase near that city
Sidi Slimane Echcharraa, a town in Berkane Province, Oriental
Sidi Slimane Moul Al Kifane, a town in Meknès-El Menzeh Prefecture, Fès-Meknès
Places in Algeria:
Sidi Slimane, El Bayadh, a town in El Bayadh Province, Algeria
Sidi Slimane, El Oued, a village in Bayadha Commune, El Oued Province, Algeria
Sidi Slimane, Ouargla, a town in Ouargla Province
Sidi Slimane, Tissemsilt, a town in Tissemsilt Province